Provincial elections were held in Vojvodina in May 2012. The first round was held on 6 May, while the second round was held on 20 May.

Lists which participated in the elections
 Choice for a Better Vojvodina - Dr Bojan Pajtić (Izbor za bolju Vojvodinu - Dr Bojan Pajtić), a coalition led by the Democratic Party
 League of Social Democrats of Vojvodina - Nenad Čanak (Liga Socijaldemokrata Vojvodine - Nenad Čanak)
 United Regions of Serbia - Mlađan Dinkić (Ujedinjeni regioni Srbije - Mlađan Dinkić)
 Serbian Radical Party - Dr Vojislav Šešelj (Srpska Radikalna Stranka - Dr Vojislav Šešelj)
 Let's Get Vojvodina Moving - Tomislav Nikolić (Pokrenimo Vojvodinu - Tomislav Nikolić), a coalition led by the Serbian Progressive Party
 Democratic Party of Serbia - Vojislav Koštunica (Demokratska Stranka Srbije - Vojislav Koštunica)
 Čedomir Jovanović - Vojvodinian U-Turn (Čedomir Jovanović - Vojvođanski Preokret)
 Ivica Dačić - SPS - PUPS - JS - SDPS, a coalition of Socialist Party of Serbia, Party of United Pensioners of Serbia, United Serbia and Socialdemocratic Party of Serbia
 Alliance of Vojvodina Hungarians - István Pásztor (Savez Vojvođanskih Mađara - István Pásztor
 Dveri for Serbian Vojvodina (Dveri za Srpsku Vojvodinu)
 All Together: BDZ, GSM, DZH, DZVM, Slovak Party - Laslo Rac Sabo (Sve Zajedno: BDZ, GSM, DZH, DZVM, Slovačka Stranka - Laslo Rac Sabo), a coalition of Bosniak Democratic Union, Civil Alliance of Hungarians, Democratic Union of Croats, Democratic Fellowship of Vojvodina Hungarians and Slovak Party
 Movement of Hungarian Hope - Balint Laslo (Pokret Mađarske Nade - Balint Laslo)
 Montenegrin Party - Nenad Stevović (Crnogorska Partija - Nenad Stevović)
 Serb Democratic Party - Dragan Dašić (Srpska Demokratska Stranka - Dragan Dašić)

Results

References

Elections in Vojvodina
Vojvodina
Vojvodina